The 2007–08 season was Juventus Football Club's 110th in existence and first season back in the top flight of Italian football.

Season review
On 4 June 2007, Claudio Ranieri was appointed the new manager following the resignation of Didier Deschamps. With the club back in Serie A, new signings such as Czech international Zdeněk Grygera, Portuguese midfielder Tiago Mendes and Sergio Almirón were brought in to strengthen the squad while promising youngsters such as Sebastian Giovinco, Claudio Marchisio and Paolo De Ceglie were sent out on loan or co-ownership deals.

Juventus finished third that season to qualify for next season's Champions League, their first participation in that competition since 2005–06.

Players

Squad information

Competitions

Serie A

League table

Matches

Coppa Italia

Third Round

Round of 16

Quarter-finals

Statistics

Goalscorers
Updated to games played 17 May 2008

Transfers

In

Out

Out on loan

References

Juventus F.C. seasons
Juventus